Zanadin Fariz (born 31 May 2004) is an Indonesian professional footballer who plays as a midfielder for Liga 1 club Persis Solo and the Indonesia national under-20 team.

Club career

Persis Solo
He was signed for Persis Solo to play in Liga 1 in the 2022 season. Zanadin made his league debut on 25 July 2022 in a match against Dewa United at the Moch. Soebroto Stadium, Magelang.

International career
Zanadin earned his first U-19 international cap on 4 July 2022 against Brunei U-19 in a 7–0 win in the 2022 AFF U-19 Youth Championship. On 16 September 2022, Zanadin scored his first international goal against Hong Kong U-20 in a 5–1 win in the 2023 AFC U-20 Asian Cup qualification. In October 2022, it was reported that Zanadin received a call-up from the Indonesia U-20 for a training camp, in Turkey and Spain.

Career statistics

Club

International goals
International under-20 goals

References

External links
 Zanadin Fariz at Soccerway
 Zanadin Fariz at Liga Indonesia

2004 births
Living people
People from Bekasi
Sportspeople from West Java
Indonesian footballers
Liga 1 (Indonesia) players
Persis Solo players
Indonesia youth international footballers
Association football midfielders